Governor Warner may refer to:

Fred M. Warner (1865–1923), 26th Governor of Michigan
Mark Warner (born 1954), 69th Governor of Virginia
Thomas Warner (explorer) (1580–1649), Governor of Saint Christopher from 1623 to 1649, Governor of St. Kitts, Nevis, Barbados and Montserrat in 1625, and Governor of Antigua from 1632 to 1635